Chuhar Chak is a town located in the Moga district of Punjab, India.

Geography

This village is surrounded by Dhudike (1 km), Daudhar (5 km), Daangian (5 km), Kaonke Kalan (4 km), Nanaksar Kaleran (6 km), Galib Kalan (7 km), Killi Chahlan (4 km). Ajitwal is the nearest railway station at 4 km.

Demographics

The village has total population of 1,636 with 277 households, 893 males and 743 females.

Culture

Punjabi is the mother tongue as well as the official language of the village.

Religion
The villagers are mainly Sikhs and follows the Sikh faith with Hindu minorities.

Education

Senior Secondary School was established as Khalsa High School in 1904. There is an ITI for girls.

Sarpanch (village head) 

Charanjit Kaur Gill - she is sarpanch of as of 30 December, 2018.

Personalities
Lachhman Singh Gill, former Chief Minister of Punjab
Jagjit Gill, director of the movie Putt Jattan De

References

See also

Buttar - a Jatt clan

Villages in Moga district
Moga, Punjab